Hanımlara Mahsus Gazete (Ottoman Turkish: Newspaper for Ladies) was an Ottoman women's magazine which was published in Istanbul from 1895 to 1908. It was one of the long-term publications in the Ottoman Empire which shaped the literary traditions of the Ottoman women. However, due to the intensive censorship during the reign of Sultan Abdulhamit the magazine mostly featured conventional topics.

History and profile
Hanımlara Mahsus Gazete was first published on 19 August 1895. At the initial phase it appeared biweekly, and from the fifty-second issue it became a weekly publication. The license holder and editor of the magazine was Ibn Hakkı Mehmet Tahir who also owned a newspaper, Tarık. Hanımlara Mahsus Gazete was the sole Ottoman women's magazine which had an editorial board, including Makbule Leman, Nigar Osman Hanım, Fatma Şadiye, Mustafa Asım, Faik Ali, Talat Ali and Gülistan İsmet. Each of them also served as the editor-in-chief of the magazine. Later the administration of the magazine was assumed by Fatma Şadiye, wife of Mehmet Tahir.

Its target audience was Muslim women from the upper classes. The magazine covered a range of topics, including education, family, household management, child-rearing, hygiene, health, beauty, embroidery, leisure and fashion. It also featured articles about the women's rights. The magazine was a supporter of Sultan Abdulhamit. Major contributors were the sisters, Fatma Aliye and Emine Semiye. Of them Fatma Aliye published an editorial column in the magazine from its start in 1895 to its closure in 1908. The common goal of all contrbitors was to redefine the role of the Muslim Ottoman women in the changing socio-political environment of the Ottoman Empire.

The magazine produced several supplements such as Hanım Kızlara Mahsus targeting female youth and Hanımlara Mahsus Kütüphane, a literary supplement. It contributed to the charity organizations designed to assist women through the donations from its sales. Hanımlara Mahsus Gazete ended publication with the last issue dated 13 August 1908 and produced 624 issues during its lifetime.

References

1895 establishments in the Ottoman Empire
1908 disestablishments in the Ottoman Empire
Biweekly magazines published in Turkey
Defunct magazines published in Turkey
Magazines established in 1895
Magazines disestablished in 1908
Magazines published in Istanbul
Turkish-language magazines
Weekly magazines published in Turkey
Women's magazines published in Turkey